Steve Brown Sports Complex is a multi-purpose outdoor sports facility in Brantford, Ontario and located at Lions Park on 20 Edge Street. Built original in 1972 as Lions Park arena, which included a banquet hall for community purposes. Later expanded to include a track field with several baseball and soccer fields with a seating capacity of 2000. In 2002, the exterior part of the facility was renamed in honor of community leader and organizer Steve Brown. In 2010, the facility was upgraded in order to serve as the home venue to the Canadian Soccer League's newest franchise the Brantford Galaxy.

References 

Soccer venues in Ontario
Athletics (track and field) venues in Ontario
Multi-purpose stadiums in Canada
Indoor arenas in Ontario